Jascha Franklin-Hodge is the former chief information officer for the City of Boston, Massachusetts, under Mayor Marty Walsh and former co-founder and partner for digital consulting firm Blue State Digital. Boston Mayor Michelle Wu appointed Franklin-Hodge on December 7, 2021 as her administration's new Chief of Streets, a position that oversees the Boston Transportation Department and Public Works Department.

Early life and career

Franklin-Hodge entered Massachusetts Institute of Technology to study computer science. His passion for software began before university when he worked for Software Tool & Die, based in Brookline, Massachusetts. He continued his software development career at Art Technology Group through his first year at MIT. Before his sophomore year, he left school in 1998 to work full-time at Spinner in the Bay Area before the company was acquired by AOL to become AOL Music, an early digital venture into online music.

Dean campaign and Blue State Digital

He left AOL in 2003 to join the upstart and dark-horse presidential campaign for Howard Dean, heading to Vermont to lead the technology team powering the first new-media focused political campaign. At the campaign he was introduced to his eventual co-founders of Blue State Digital, Clay Johnson, Joe Rospars, and Ben Self.

After the campaign folded in early 2004, the four founded Blue State Digital, with offices in Boston and Washington, D.C. The mission was to replicate the new media success of the Howard Dean presidential campaign and provide the same technology to progressive and democratic political candidates across the country.

Franklin-Hodge spent 10 years as a partner and chief technology officer for the company, including the infrastructure powering the company's biggest client, the 2008 Obama presidential campaign. The company was acquired by WPP in 2010. By the time he left the company, the technology he oversaw had raised over $1.6 billion and sent over 24 billion emails on behalf of over 500 clients.

Post-Blue State Digital and public service

He left the company in 2014 when Mayor Marty Walsh of Boston named him the new chief information officer for the city, with the mandate of modernizing the IT infrastructure for the city government, and creating the first digital office to implement 21st-century digital citizen services for city residents. He focused city technology teams on data and analytics to drive citizen-focused decisions.

In January 2018, he stepped down from his position, leaving public service.

References 

Chief information officers
1979 births
Living people
Massachusetts Institute of Technology alumni
American company founders
American chief technology officers